Munich Marienplatz is an important stop on the Munich S-Bahn and U-Bahn network, located under the square of the same name in Munich's city centre. The station is one of the most frequently used stations in the network, with up to 24,400 people transferring and 8,000 passengers entering or exiting each hour. In 2007, 175,400 people used the station daily on weekdays, including entries, exits and transfers.

History
In October 1966 construction was started, finishing in October 1971 as part of the new S-Bahn network for the 1972 Summer Olympics.  Until early 2003 there were almost no further refurbishments done at the station.  From 2003 to 2006, the platforms of the U-Bahn were widened to expand passenger capacity and were lifted by 4 cm to secure same-level boarding.

The increase in traffic and the new Allianz Arena also required a larger capacity of this already overcrowded pivotal transfer station. New pedestrian tunnels were built, which provide more room for passengers transferring from and to the S-Bahn. They lie parallel to the existing platforms and are connected to them by 11 portals. At the south end, they meet the transverse tunnel, where the escalators to the S-Bahn platforms are located.

Under the Zweite Stammstrecke ("Second main line") tunnel project, Marienplatz station is to be connected to a second station further north, Marienhof, via the enlarged subway access tunnels on the fourth level.

Parts the music video for Four Out of Five by the Arctic Monkeys features the station as Alex Turner walks down a tunnel called the U-Bahn.

Station layout
Marienplatz station is completely underground and consists of four levels:

 First Level: The first level sprawls underneath the Marienplatz, with exits on all four ends of the square (clockwise from north-west: Weinstraße, north-east: Fischbrunnen/Tal, south-east: Rindermarkt, south-west: Sendlinger Straße). It contains a shopping passage, an MVG service centre, ticket booths, and the entrances to the S- and U-Bahn.
 Second Level: The second level contains the eastbound S-Bahn track with two side platforms, in Spanish solution. The larger platform is for embarking, the smaller for disembarking and connection to the subways. The platforms are each 210 metres long and 96 cm high. The Olympic Park station in Sydney copies this arrangement, albeit with two tracks and four platforms.
 Third Level: The third level contains the westbound S-Bahn track with two side platforms, also laid out in Spanish solution.
 Fourth Level: The fourth level, accessible directly from all three levels, contains the two U-Bahn tracks on two side platforms connected to the rest of the station by wide newly built access tunnels.

The services

S-Bahn

All S-Bahn lines service Marienplatz, except . This equals a train every 2–4 minutes per direction.

U-Bahn
The U-Bahn services Marienplatz with 3-10 min intervals in off-peak hours, and every 2-3 min during rush hours.

Gallery

References

External links
 
 
 

Marienplatz
Marienplatz
Marienplatz
Railway stations in Germany opened in 1971
1971 establishments in West Germany